Coremiocnemis is a genus of tarantulas that was first described by Eugène Louis Simon in 1892. They are named after the greek words korema, which means broom or brush, and kemis, meaning shin guard. Being a reference to the hirsute characteristics of the posterior legs.

Diagnosis 
They can be distinguished from other genera by having long, hair brushes along the retrolateral metatarsus and tarsus in leg 4. Females also own a spermathecae with two lobes, males with pegs in the chelicarae.

Species
 it contains six species, with three other transferred to Psednocnemis, they are found in Indonesia, Malaysia, and Queensland: 
Coremiocnemis cunicularia (Simon, 1892) (type) – Malaysia
Coremiocnemis hoggi West & Nunn, 2010 – Malaysia
Coremiocnemis kotacana West & Nunn, 2010 – Indonesia (Sumatra)
Coremiocnemis obscura West & Nunn, 2010 – Malaysia
Coremiocnemis tropix Raven, 2005 – Australia (Queensland)
Coremiocnemis valida Pocock, 1895 – Borneo

Transferred to other genera 

 Coremiocnemis brachyramosa West & Nunn, 2010 → Psednocnemis brachyramosa 
 Coremiocnemis gnathospina West & Nunn, 2010 → Psednocnemis gnathospina
 Coremiocnemis jeremyhuffi West & Nunn, 2010 → Psednocnemis jeremyhuffi

See also
 List of Theraphosidae species

References

Theraphosidae genera
Spiders of Asia
Spiders of Australia
Theraphosidae